The men's 110 metres hurdles event at the 1977 Summer Universiade was held at the Vasil Levski National Stadium in Sofia on 20 and 21 August.

Medalists

Results

Heats

Wind:Heat 1: ? m/s, Heat 2: -0.1 m/s, Heat 3: +1.8 m/s

Final

Wind: +0.6 m/s

References

Athletics at the 1977 Summer Universiade
1977